The Diving competition in the 1985 Summer Universiade were held in Kobe, Japan.

Medal overview

Medal table

References
 

1985 Summer Universiade
1985
1985 in diving